A Strange Encounter is the fourth studio album by Cornish indie rock band Thirteen Senses. It was released on 5 May 2014.

Track listing
 A Brief History 2:57
 Stars Make Progress 7:30
 A Strange Encounter 4:35
 Lost 1:45
 The Hour 1:25
 In Lunar Light 3:22
 Gathered Here a Stranger 5:29
 Here and Now 1:59
 Waves 4:41
 In Time 5:11

Reception
Norman Fleischer gave a mixed review of the album, noting the Thirteen Sense's failure to live up to the initial success of The Invitation. Fleischer writes: "On the other side A Strange Encounter somehow also sees the band liberating itself from any expectations. But somehow it also feels a bit more like a tender final wave from a talented band like the desperately needed new start. This gives the new Thirteen Senses record a somehow bittersweet aftertaste. And ironically that's the most fitting environment for their music."

References 

2014 albums
Thirteen Senses albums